I Want! I Want! (stylized in all lowercase) is the debut studio album by Walk the Moon. It was self-released by the band.

Track listing

Personnel
Walk the Moon
Nicholas Petricca – lead vocals, keyboards, percussion
Nicholas Lerangis – guitar, backing vocals
Adam Reifsnyder – bass, backing vocals
Adrian Galvin – drums, backing vocals, percussion

References

External links

2010 debut albums
Walk the Moon albums
Self-released albums